Shabak may refer to:

Shabak people, an ethnic group in northern Iraq
Shabaki language, a language of the subgroup Zaza-Gorani of the Northwestern Iranian languages, spoken by the Shabak people
Shabakism, the religion of the Shabak people
 Hebrew acronym for the Shin Bet, Israel's internal security service
Schabak Modell, a die-cast toy producer